Birinci Çağan (also, Bash-Chagan, Chagan, and Chagan Pervoye) is a village in the Shamakhi Rayon of Azerbaijan.  The village forms part of the municipality of Çağan.

References 

Populated places in Shamakhi District